Guntur Djafril is a Singaporean professional soccer player who plays for Admiralty FC in the NFL Division 1, the second tier of football in Singapore. Before that he played for Woodlands Wellington FC in the S.League.

He played as a striker during his Prime League days but was deployed as a winger while playing for Woodlands Wellington FC.

Club career
Djafril has previously played for S.League clubs Geylang United, Paya Lebar Punggol FC (now known as Hougang United and SAFFC) before joining Woodlands Wellington in the 2010 S.League season. He was the Captain cum top scorer when the Geylang Utd Prime League team lifted the Prime League Trophy in 2006.

He made his debut in Asia's premier club competition, the AFC Champions League, as a second-half substitute in a group stage match against Kashima Antlers on 7 April 2009 while playing for SAFFC.

On 23 November 2012, it was announced by Woodlands Wellington that he would not be retained for the 2013 season.

Club career statistics

All numbers encased in brackets signify substitute appearances.

References

External links
 https://web.archive.org/web/20100723192614/http://data2.7m.cn/player_data/81336/en/index.shtml
 

1987 births
Living people
Singaporean footballers
Hougang United FC players
Geylang International FC players
Warriors FC players
Woodlands Wellington FC players
Singapore Premier League players
Association football forwards